Cestina may refer to:
Sestina, a form of poetry
Čeština, the native name of the Czech language